Dunville's VR was a rare pure pot still whiskey distilled by Dunville & Co at the Royal Irish Distillery in Belfast. It was younger and less blended than Dunville's other whiskey Dunville's Three Crowns.

The Echlinville Distillery
Dunville's VR Old Irish Whiskey and Dunville's Three Crowns Irish Whiskey are now being produced at the Echlinville Distillery in Kircubbin, County Down, and came on the market in 2016.

References

External links
The Dunville Family of Northern Ireland and Dunville's Whisky

Irish whiskey